Ebrahimi is an Iranian surname which may refer to:

 Abolfazl Ebrahimi (born 1982), Iranian footballer
 Amir Farshad Ebrahimi, Iranian activist
 Asghar Ebrahimi, Iranian weightlifter
 Hossein Ebrahimi, Iranian footballer
 Mohammad Ebrahimi, Iranian footballer
 Mohammad Ebrahimi (journalist), Iranian journalist
 Nader Ebrahimi, Iranian writer
 Omid Ebrahimi, Iranian footballer
 Zar Amir Ebrahimi, Iranian actress
 Touradj Ebrahimi, Swiss-Iranian engineer and computer scientist, president of JPEG, developer of MPEG-4 and JPEG 2000 standards

Persian-language surnames
Patronymic surnames
Surnames from given names